Giacomo Puccini (1858–1924) was an Italian composer, mainly of operas.

Puccini may also refer to:

People
 Alessandro Puccini (born 1968), Italian fencer
 Biagio Puccini (1673–1721), Italian painter
 Domenico Puccini (1772–1815), Italian composer, grandfather of Giacomo Puccini
 Gianni Puccini (1914–1968), Italian screenwriter and film director
 Jacopo Puccini (1712–1781), Italian composer and great-great-grandfather of the opera composer Giacomo Puccini
 Mario Puccini (1869–1920), Italian painter
 Matthew Puccini (born ), American LGBT filmmaker
 Simonetta Puccini (1929–2017), granddaughter of Giacomo Puccini
 Tommaso Puccini (1749-1811), Italian art historian
 Vittoria Puccini (born 1981), Italian film and television actress

Other uses
 Puccini (film), 1953 Italian film about the composer directed by Carmine Gallone
 Puccini (horse), New Zealand racehorse (foaled 2010)
 4579 Puccini, main-belt asteroid named after Giacomo Puccini
 Puccini Spur, a rock spur in Alexander Island, Antarctica, named after Giacomo Puccini

See also